Wik-Me'nh is a Paman language of the Cape York Peninsula of Queensland, Australia

References 

Wik languages
Endangered indigenous Australian languages in Queensland

pms:Lenga wik-ngathana
sv:Wik-ngathana